The Goose of Sedan is a 1959 French-West German comedy war film directed by Helmut Käutner and starring Hardy Krüger, Jean Richard and Dany Carrel. It was based on the novel Un Dimanche au Champ D'Honneur by Jean L'Hôte. The film was one of a growing number of co-productions between the two countries during the era. It was also released under the alternative title Without Trumpet or Drum.

The film was shot at the Billancourt Studios in Paris. The film's sets were designed by the art director Serge Piménoff.

Synopsis
After the Battle of Sedan during the Franco-Prussian War a pair of soldiers, one French and one German, become separated from their respective units.  Taking shelter in a farmhouse, the two begin to bond despite their rivalry over a woman.

Partial Cast
 Hardy Krüger as Fritz Brösicke
 Jean Richard as Leon Riffard
 Dany Carrel as Marguerite
 Françoise Rosay as La grand-mère de Marguerite
 Theo Lingen as Colonel Tuplitz
 Helmut Käutner as Königliche Hoheit
 Fritz Tillmann as Hauptmann Knöpfer
 Ralf Wolter as Uhlan Lehmann
 Lucien Nat as Captain

References

Bibliography
 Bergfelder, Tim. International Adventures: German Popular Cinema and European Co-productions in the 1960s. Berghahn Books, 2005.
 Kreimeier, Klaus. The Ufa Story: A History of Germany's Greatest Film Company, 1918–1945. University of California Press, 1999.

External links
 

1959 films
West German films
German historical comedy films
German war comedy films
French historical comedy films
French war comedy films
1950s war comedy films
1950s historical comedy films
1950s German-language films
Films directed by Helmut Käutner
Films set in France
Films set in the 1870s
Films based on French novels
Franco-Prussian War films
Films shot at Billancourt Studios
UFA GmbH films
1950s French films
1950s German films